Md Obaidul Kabir Chowdhury is a dermatologist in Bangladesh. He was awarded the Independence Day Award in 2020 for his unique contribution to medicine.

Career 
Chowdhury passed MBBS from Dhaka Medical College and Hospital in 1984. He started working at Dhaka Medical College and Hospital. He graduated from the University of Vienna in 1965 with a degree in Dermatology and Venereology. After retirement he was the principal of Samaritan Medical College. Since 2003, he has been working as a Professor in the Department of Dermatology at Family Red Crescent Medical College and Hospital. He was the personal physician of Prime Minister of Bangladesh, Sheikh Hasina.

Awards 
Chowdhury was awarded the Independence Day Award, the highest civilian honour, in 2020 for his contribution to the medical field.

References 

Bangladeshi dermatologists
People from Sunamganj District
Recipients of the Independence Day Award
Year of birth missing (living people)
Living people